Žirovnica is a settlement in northwestern Slovenia, in the Municipality of Žirovnica. It is located in the historic Upper Carniola region, on the southern slope of the Karawanks mountain range, close to the border with Austria.

Name
Žirovnica was first attested in written sources in 1253 as Zarnonize (and as Zaronitz in 1306–1309, Sernavnicz in 1344). The name developed from *Žьrnovьnica, derived from žьrny 'quern', a metaphorical reference to the shape of the valley where it is located. In the past the German name was Scheraunitz.

History
During the Second World War, a battle took place between German units and the Partisan Cankar Brigade on 20 February 1942 on nearby Mount Stol, during which the Prešeren Lodge was also burned (it was not rebuilt until 1965). The Partisans burned the wooden railway station in the town on 13 September 1942. After the Second World War, a Yugoslav labor camp for political prisoners operated in Žirovnica.

Notable people
Notable people that were born or lived in Žirovnica include:
Janez Čop (1810–1846), writer
Matija Čop (1797–1835), linguist
Urban Gollmayr (1820–1905), priest
Tomo Kajdiš (1834–1914), politician

References

External links

Official website (in Slovene)
Žirovnica at Geopedia

Populated places in the Municipality of Žirovnica